Theodore Sturgeon (born Edward Hamilton Waldo, February 26, 1918 – May 8, 1985) was an American fiction author of primarily fantasy, science fiction, and horror, as well as a critic. He wrote approximately 400 reviews and more than 120 short stories, 11 novels, and several scripts for Star Trek: The Original Series.

Sturgeon's science fiction novel More Than Human (1953) won the 1954 International Fantasy Award (for SF and fantasy) as the year's best novel, and the Science Fiction Writers of America ranked "Baby Is Three" number five among the "Greatest Science Fiction Novellas of All Time" to 1964. Ranked by votes for all of their pre-1965 novellas, Sturgeon was second among authors, behind Robert Heinlein.

An overview of his work by science fiction critic Sam Moskowitz can be found in the collective biography Seekers of Tomorrow.

The Science Fiction and Fantasy Hall of Fame inducted Sturgeon in 2000, its fifth class of two dead and two living writers.

Biography
Sturgeon was born Edward Hamilton Waldo in Staten Island, New York, in 1918. His name was legally changed to Theodore Sturgeon at age eleven after his mother's divorce and remarriage to William Dicky ("Argyll") Sturgeon.

He sold his first story in 1938 to the McClure Syndicate, which bought much of his early work. At first he wrote mainly short stories, primarily for genre magazines such as Astounding and Unknown, but also for general-interest publications such as Argosy Magazine. He used the pen name "E. Waldo Hunter" when two of his stories ran in the same issue of Astounding. A few of his early stories were signed "Theodore H. Sturgeon".

Sturgeon ghost-wrote one Ellery Queen mystery novel, The Player on the Other Side (Random House, 1963).  This novel was praised by critic H. R. F. Keating: "[I] had almost finished writing Crime and Mystery: The 100 Best Books, in which I had included The Player on the Other Side ... placing the book squarely in the Queen canon" when he learned that it had been written by Sturgeon. Similarly, William DeAndrea, author and winner of Mystery Writers of America awards, selecting his ten favorite mystery novels for the magazine Armchair Detective, picked The Player on the Other Side as one of them.  He said: "This book changed my life ... and made a raving mystery fan (and therefore ultimately a mystery writer) out of me. ... The book must be 'one of the most skilful pastiches in the history of literature. An amazing piece of work, whomever did it'."

Disliking arguments with John W. Campbell over editorial decisions, after 1950 Sturgeon only published one story in Astounding. Sturgeon wrote the screenplays for the Star Trek: The Original Series episodes "Shore Leave" (1966) and "Amok Time" (1967, written up and published as a Bantam Books "Star Trek Fotonovel" in 1978). The latter featured the first appearance of pon farr, the Vulcan mating ritual, the sentence "Live long and prosper" and the Vulcan hand symbol. Sturgeon also wrote several Star Trek  scripts that were never produced. One of these first introduced the Prime Directive. 

He also wrote an episode of the Saturday morning show Land of the Lost, "The Pylon Express", in 1975. Two of Sturgeon's stories were adapted for The New Twilight Zone. One, "A Saucer of Loneliness", was broadcast in 1986 and was dedicated to his memory. Another short story, "Yesterday Was Monday", was the inspiration for The New Twilight Zone episode "A Matter of Minutes". His 1944 novella Killdozer! was the inspiration for the 1974 made-for-TV movie, Marvel comic book, and alternative rock band of the same name, as well as becoming the colloquial name for Marvin Heemeyer's 2004 bulldozer rage incident.

Sturgeon published the "first stories in science fiction which dealt with homosexuality, 'The World Well Lost' [June 1953] and 'Affair with a Green Monkey' [May 1957]", and sometimes put gay subtext in his work, such as the back-rub scene in "Shore Leave", or in his Western story, "Scars". 

Though not as well known to the general public as contemporaries like Isaac Asimov or Ray Bradbury, Sturgeon is well known among readers of mid-20th-century science fiction anthologies. At the height of his popularity in the 1950s he was the most anthologized English-language author alive. Three Sturgeon stories were adapted for the 1950s NBC radio anthology X Minus One: "A Saucer of Loneliness" (broadcast twice}, "The Stars Are the Styx" and "Mr. Costello, Hero". 

Carl Sagan described "To Here and the Easel" as "a stunning portrait of personality disassociation as perceived from the inside", and further said that many of Sturgeon's works were among the "rare few science‐fiction novels [that] combine a standard science‐fiction theme with a deep human sensitivity". John Clute wrote in The Encyclopedia of Science Fiction: "His influence upon writers like Harlan Ellison and Samuel R. Delany was seminal, and in his life and work he was a powerful and generally liberating influence in post-WWII US sf". He won comparatively few genre awards. (One was the World Fantasy Award for Life Achievement from the 1985 World Fantasy Convention.)

Sturgeon's original novels were all published between 1950 and 1961, and the bulk of his short story work dated from the 1940s and 1950s.  Though he continued to write through 1983, his work rate dipped noticeably in the later years of his life; a 1971 story collection entitled Sturgeon Is Alive and Well... addressed Sturgeon's seeming withdrawal from the public eye in a tongue-in-cheek manner.  Sturgeon lived for several years in Springfield, Oregon. He died on May 8, 1985, of lung fibrosis, at Sacred Heart General Hospital in the neighboring city of Eugene.

He was a member of the all-male literary banqueting club the Trap Door Spiders, which served as the basis of Isaac Asimov's fictional group of mystery solvers the Black Widowers.  Sturgeon was the inspiration for the recurrent character of Kilgore Trout in the novels of Kurt Vonnegut.

Sturgeon's Law

In 1951, Sturgeon coined what is now known as Sturgeon's Law:
 "Ninety percent of [science fiction] is crud, but then, ninety percent of everything is crud."
This was originally known as Sturgeon's Revelation; Sturgeon has said that "Sturgeon's Law" was originally
 "Nothing is always absolutely so."
However, the former statement is now widely referred to as Sturgeon's Law. He is also known for his dedication to a credo of critical thinking that challenged all normative assumptions: "Ask the next question." He represented this credo by the symbol of a Q with an arrow through it, an example of which he wore around his neck and used as part of his signature in the last 15 years of his life.

Life and family
Theodore's birth father, Edward Waldo, was a color and dye manufacturer of middling success.  With his second wife, Anne, he had one daughter, Joan. Theodore's mother, Christine Hamilton Dicker (Waldo) Sturgeon, was a well-educated writer, watercolorist, and poet who published journalism, poetry, and fiction under the name Felix Sturgeon. His stepfather, William Dickie Sturgeon (sometimes known as Argyll), was a mathematics teacher at a prep school and then Romance Languages Professor at Drexel Institute (later Drexel Institute of Technology) in Philadelphia. Sturgeon's account of his stepfather is included in a posthumous memoir. Sturgeon's sibling, Peter Sturgeon, wrote technical material for the pharmaceutical industry and the WHO, and founded the American branch of Mensa.

Sturgeon held a wide variety of jobs during his lifetime. As an adolescent, he wanted to be a circus acrobat; an episode of rheumatic fever prevented him from pursuing this. From 1935 (aged 17) to 1938, he was a sailor in the merchant marine, and elements of that experience found their way into several stories. He sold refrigerators door to door. He managed a hotel in Jamaica around 1940–1941, worked in several construction and infrastructure jobs (driving a bulldozer in Puerto Rico, operating a gas station and truck lubrication center, work at a drydock) for the US Army in the early war years, and by 1944 was an advertising copywriter. In addition to freelance fiction and television writing, in New York City he opened his own literary agency (which was eventually transferred to Scott Meredith), worked for Fortune magazine and other Time Inc. properties on circulation, and edited various publications. Sturgeon had somewhat irregular output, frequently suffering from writer's block.

Sturgeon played guitar and wrote music which he sometimes performed at science fiction conventions.

Sturgeon was married three times, had two long-term committed relationships outside of marriage, divorced once, and fathered a total of seven children.

 His first wife was Dorothe Fillingame (married 1940, divorced 1945) with whom he had two daughters, Patricia and Cynthia.
 He was married to singer Mary Mair from 1949 until an annulment in 1951.
 In 1953, he wed Marion McGahan with whom he had a son, Robin (b. 1952); daughters Tandy (b. 1954) and Noël (b. 1956); and son Timothy (b. 1960). The children in "Tandy's Story" (1961) have the same names as these children.
 In 1969, he began living with Wina Golden, a journalist, with whom he had a son, Andros.
 Finally, his last long-term committed relationship was with writer and educator Jayne Englehart Tannehill, with whom he remained until the time of his death. Jayne Englehart had her own biological son, Mark J. Englehart, prior to her partnership with Sturgeon, to whom Sturgeon became like a stepfather.

Sturgeon was a lifelong pipe smoker. His death from lung fibrosis may have been caused by exposure to asbestos during his merchant marine years.

Novels
 The Dreaming Jewels (1950)  Also published as The Synthetic Man 
 More Than Human (1953) Fix-up of three linked novellas, the first and third written around Baby Is Three (Galaxy Science Fiction, October 1952)
 The Cosmic Rape (1958) A shorter version was published as To Marry Medusa
 Venus Plus X (1960)
 Some of Your Blood (1961)
 Godbody (1986) Published posthumously

Novelizations
Sturgeon, under his own name, was hired to write novelizations of the following movies based on their scripts (links go to articles about the movies):
 The King and Four Queens (1956)
 Voyage to the Bottom of the Sea (1961)  The book is described in Voyage to the Bottom of the Sea (novel).
 The Rare Breed (1966)

Pseudonymous novels
 I, Libertine (1956): Historical novel created as a for-hire hoax.  Credited to "Frederick R. Ewing", written from a premise by Jean Shepherd.
 The Player on The Other Side (1963): Mystery novel credited to Ellery Queen and ghost-written with Queen's assistance and supervision.

Short stories

Sturgeon published numerous short story collections during his lifetime, many drawing on his most prolific writing years of the 1940s and 1950s.

Note that some reprints of these titles (especially paperback editions) may cut one or two stories from the line-up.  Statistics herein refer to the original editions only.

Collections published during Sturgeon's lifetime

The following table includes sixteen volumes (one of them collecting western stories).  These are considered "original" collections of Sturgeon material, in that they compiled previously uncollected stories.  However, some volumes did contain a few reprinted stories: this list includes books that collected only previously uncollected material, as well as those volumes that collected mostly new material, but also contained up to three stories (representing no more than half the book) that were previously published in a Sturgeon collection.

The following six collections consisted entirely of reprints of previously collected material:

Complete short stories
North Atlantic Books released the chronologically assembled The Complete Short Stories of Theodore Sturgeon, edited by Paul Williams. The series consisted of 13 volumes published between 1994 and 2010. Introductions were provided by Harlan Ellison, Samuel R. Delany, Kurt Vonnegut, Gene Wolfe, Connie Willis, Jonathan Lethem, and others. Extensive story notes were provided by Paul Williams and, in the last two volumes, Sturgeon's daughter Noël.

 Volume I – The Ultimate Egoist (1937 to 1940)
 Volume II – Microcosmic God (1940 to 1941)
 Volume III – Killdozer (1941 to 1946)
 Volume IV – Thunder and Roses (1946 to 1948)
 Volume V – The Perfect Host (1948 to 1950)
 Volume VI – Baby is Three (1950 to 1952)
 Volume VII – A Saucer of Loneliness (1953)
 Volume VIII – Bright Segment (1953 to 1955, as well as two "lost" stories from 1946)
 Volume IX – And Now the News... (1955 to 1957)
 Volume X – The Man Who Lost the Sea (1957 to 1960)
 Volume XI – The Nail and the Oracle (1961 to 1969)
 Volume XII – Slow Sculpture (1970 to 1972, plus one 1954 novella and one unpublished story)
 Volume XIII – Case and The Dreamer (1972 to 1983, plus one 1960 story and three unpublished stories)

Representative short stories
Sturgeon was best known for his short stories and novellas. The best-known include:
 "Ether Breather" (September 1939, his first published science-fiction story)
 "Derm Fool" (March 1940)
 "It" (August 1940)
 "Shottle Bop" (February 1941)
 "Microcosmic God" (April 1941)
 "Yesterday Was Monday" (1941)
 "Killdozer!" (November, 1944)
 "Maturity" (February, 1947)
 "Bianca's Hands" (May, 1947)
 "Thunder and Roses" (November 1947)
 "The Perfect Host" (November 1948)
 "It Wasn't Syzygy" (January 1948)
 "Minority Report" (June 1949, no connection to the 2002 movie, which was based on a later story by Philip K. Dick)
 "One Foot and the Grave" (September 1949)
 "Baby Is Three" (October 1952)
 "A Saucer of Loneliness" (February 1953)
 "The World Well Lost" (June 1953)
 "Mr. Costello, Hero" (December 1953)
 "The [Widget], The [Wadget], and Boff" (1955)
 "The Skills of Xanadu" (July 1956)
 "The Other Man" (September 1956)
 "And Now The News" (December 1956)
 "The Girl Had Guts" (January 1957)
 "The Man Who Lost the Sea" (October 1959)
 "Need" (1960)
 "How to Forget Baseball" (Sports Illustrated, December 1964)
 "The Nail and the Oracle" (Playboy, October 1964)
 "If All Men Were Brothers, Would You Let One Marry Your Sister?" (1967, Dangerous Visions anthology edited by Harlan Ellison)—Nebula Award 1967 Nominee Novella
 "The Man Who Learned Loving"—Nebula Award 1969 Nominee Short Story
 "Slow Sculpture" (Galaxy, February 1970) — winner of a Hugo Award and a Nebula Award
 "Occam's Scalpel" (August, 1971, with an introduction by Terry Carr)
 "Vengeance Is." (1980, Dark Forces anthology edited by Kirby McCauley)

Autobiography
 Argyll: A Memoir (pamphlet, Sturgeon Project, 1993), an autobiographical sketch about Sturgeon's relationship with his stepfather. Introduction by his editor Paul Williams. Afterword by Samuel R. Delany. Cover art by Donna Nassar. The memoir, written for his psychotherapist, has many suggestions about his life, starting from his family's move from Staten Island to Philadelphia when his stepfather got a job at Drexel University and Sturgeon and his brother were still in the local public school to their attempts to catch poison ivy to delay the move—"Then we moved to Philadelphia, a little apartment on 34 Street with a sort of sun room, which was Argyll's study and had a single couch which was his and Mother's bed, and a kind of living room with a kitchenette built into one wall, where we slept on the floor on mattresses."— and his father's treatment of a puppy he couldn't discipline—"... he used to whip her with a wire after rubbing her nose in it—so he got rid of her" (p. 14). These go on to include Sturgeon's first gay experiences in his 14th year—"So [20-year-old] Bert blew me practically continuously from Friday evening until dinner time Sunday; we kept score and I came 14 times. Sweet are the uses of respectability. My God! It never occurred to me until this minute that Dr. Taft was probably the one—the only one, as sole mentor, who could possibly have insured Argyll's total ignorance!" (p. 52); and in his long letter to his mother and Argyll, included in the same volume, Sturgeon harshly critiques his first novel, The Dreaming Jewels: "My use of one detested Argyll would have been fine, but one wasn't enough; there had to be two, and as a result the balance of the work was destroyed and its literary worth was lost in vengeful polemic" (p. 62).

Relationship with Kurt Vonnegut
Kurt Vonnegut likely based the name of his fictional science-fiction writer Kilgore Trout on Sturgeon's name. They became friends when Sturgeon moved to Truro, Massachusetts.

See also

 Theodore Sturgeon Award

Citations

General and cited sources

External links

 The Theodore Sturgeon Page - an informative and comprehensive fan site
 The Theodore Sturgeon Literary Trust – owners of Sturgeon copyrights, information on Sturgeon publications
 Theodore Sturgeon Papers (MS 303 and MS 254) housed at the Kenneth Spencer Research Library, University of Kansas
 
 
 
 

 Theodore Sturgeon's online fiction at Free Speculative Fiction Online
 Gary Westfahl's Biographical Encyclopedia of Science Fiction Film
 The Work of Theodore Sturgeon – lengthy biographical and critical study of Sturgeon

1918 births
1985 deaths
American horror writers
American science fiction writers
American speculative fiction critics
American speculative fiction editors
Hugo Award-winning writers
Nebula Award winners
People from Springfield, Oregon
People from Staten Island
Science fiction critics
Science Fiction Hall of Fame inductees
World Fantasy Award-winning writers
20th-century American novelists
American male novelists
American atheists
Journalists from New York City
20th-century American male writers
Novelists from New York (state)
American male non-fiction writers
Weird fiction writers